War of the Worldviews: Science vs. Spirituality is a book written by Deepak Chopra and Leonard Mlodinow, which was published in 2011, and is a debate between views on science and spirituality.

Premise
The book is written as a series of  essays by each author on a mutually-agreed-upon list of 18 questions. The science worldview is represented by Mlodinow and the spirituality worldview is represented by Chopra. Each presents his side which is followed by the other person's rebuttal.

Overall
Mlodinow suggests that "the universe operates according to laws of physics while acknowledging that science does not address why the laws exist or how they arise". Chopra says that "the laws of nature as well as mathematics share the same source as human consciousness".

See also
The Tao of Physics

References

2011 non-fiction books
British books
Books about spirituality
Books about religion and science
Debates
Harmony Books books